Qareh Papaq (also Romanized as Qareh Pāpāq and Qarah Pāpāq) is a village in Marhemetabad-e Jonubi Rural District, in the Central District of Miandoab County, West Azerbaijan Province, Iran. At the 2006 census, its population was 334, in 85 families.

References 

 Populated places in Miandoab County